Richard Lumley-Saunderson may refer to:
Richard Lumley-Saunderson, 4th Earl of Scarbrough
Richard Lumley-Saunderson, 6th Earl of Scarbrough

See also
Richard Lumley (disambiguation)